The 2017–18 LPB season was the 85th season of the premier Portuguese basketball league and the tenth season under the current Liga Portuguesa de Basquetebol (LPB) format. For sponsorship reasons, the league was also known as Liga Placard.

Benfica played as defending champions but were eliminated in the semi-finals by Porto, who in turn lost 3–0 in the final to Oliveirense, who won their first league title.

Format
The competition format consisted of two stages: a regular season, comprising two phases, and the play-offs. In the first phase of the regular season, the twelve participating teams compete against each other in a double round-robin system, with home and away matches.

The second phase of the regular season comprised two groups; the six best-ranked teams at the end of the first phase competed in Group A, and the remaining six teams competed in Group B. Again, teams in each group competed against each other in a double round-robin system, with home and away matches. The six Group A teams and the two best-ranked Group B teams qualified for the play-offs, while the two worst-ranked teams in Group B were relegated to the second-tier Proliga.

The play-offs were disputed as a single-elimination tournament, with fixtures determined by each team's classification in the previous round, and comprise three knockout rounds (quarter-finals, semi-finals and finals) played in a best-of-five system.

Teams

First phase

League table

Second stage

Group 1–6

Group 7–12

Playoffs
Seeded teams played games 1, 2 and 5 at home.

References

External links
FPB website 

Liga Portuguesa de Basquetebol seasons
Portuguese
LPB